The Baltic Mill was a copper stamping mill near Redridge, Michigan.  The Atlantic mill was located at a nearby location.

See also
 Copper mining in Michigan
 List of Copper Country mills

Metallurgical facilities in Michigan
Buildings and structures in Houghton County, Michigan